The biathlon is a winter sport that combines cross-country skiing and rifle shooting. It is treated as a race, with contestants skiing through a cross-country trail whose distance is divided into shooting rounds. The shooting rounds are not timed per se, but depending on the competition, missed shots result in extra distance or time being added to the contestant's total.

History

According to Encyclopædia Britannica, the biathlon "is rooted in the skiing traditions of Scandinavia, where early inhabitants revered the Norse god Ullr as both the ski god and the hunting god." In modern times, the activity that developed into this sport was an exercise for Norwegians as alternative training for the military. Norwegian skiing regiments organized military skiing contests in the 18th century, divided into four classes: shooting at mark while skiing at top speed, downhill race among trees, downhill race on big hills without falling, and a long race on flat ground while carrying a rifle and military pack. In modern terminology, these military contests included downhill, slalom, biathlon, and cross-country skiing. One of the world's first known ski clubs, Trysil Skytte- og Skiløberforening (the Trysil Rifle and Ski Club), was formed in Norway in 1861 to promote national defense at the local level. 20th century variants include  (the military contest), a 17 km cross-country race with shooting, and the military cross-country race at 30 km including marksmanship. 

The modern biathlon is a civilian variant of the old military combined exercise. In Norwegian, the biathlon is called  (literally ski shooting).

Called military patrol, the combination of skiing and shooting was contested at the Winter Olympic Games in 1924 and then demonstrated in 1928, 1936, and 1948, during which time Norway and Finland were strong competitors. In 1948, the sport was reorganized under the Union Internationale de Pentathlon Moderne et Biathlon and became re-accepted as an Olympic sport in 1955, with widespread popularity within the Soviet and Swedish winter sport circuits.

The first Biathlon World Championship was held in 1958 in Austria, and in 1960 the sport was finally included in the Olympic Games. At Albertville in 1992, women were first allowed in the Olympic biathlon. The pursuit format was added for the 2002 Salt Lake City Winter Olympics, and the IBU added mixed relay as a format for the 2006 Olympics.

The competitions from 1958 to 1965 used high-power centrefire cartridges, such as the .30-06 Springfield and the 7.62×51mm NATO, before the .22 Long Rifle rimfire cartridge was standardized in 1978. The ammunition was carried in a belt worn around the competitor's waist. The sole event was the men's 20 km individual, encompassing four separate ranges and firing distances of 100 m, 150 m, 200 m, and 250 m. The target distance was reduced to 150 m with the addition of the relay in 1966. The shooting range was further reduced to 50 m in 1978 with the mechanical self-indicating targets making their debut at the 1980 Winter Olympics in Lake Placid. For the 2018–2019 season, fully electronic targets were approved as an alternative to paper or mechanical steel targets for IBU events.

Governing body
In 1948, the International Modern Pentathlon Union (UIPM) was founded to standardize the rules for the modern pentathlon and from 1953 also biathlon. In July 1993, the biathlon branch of the UIPMB created the International Biathlon Union (IBU), which officially separated from the UIPMB in 1998.

Presidents of the UIPMB/IBU:
 1947–1949: Tom Wiborn (Sweden)
 1949–1960: Gustaf Dyrssen (Sweden)
 1960–1988: Sven Thofelt (Sweden)
 1988–1992: Igor Novikov (USSR/Russia)
 1992–2018: Anders Besseberg (Norway)
 Since 2018: Olle Dahlin (Sweden)

Championships

The following articles list major international biathlon events and medalists. Contrary to the Olympics and World Championships (BWCH), the World Cup (BWC) is an entire winter season of (mostly) weekly races, where the medalists are those with the highest sums of World Cup points at the end of the season.
 Biathlon at the Winter Olympics
 Biathlon World Championships
 Biathlon World Cup
 Biathlon European Championships
 IBU Cup
 Biathlon Junior World Championships
 Biathlon at the Winter Universiade

Rules and equipment
 

The complete rules of the biathlon are given in the official IBU rule books.

Basic concepts
A biathlon competition consists of a race in which contestants ski through a cross-country trail system whose total distance is divided into either two or four shooting rounds, half in the prone position, the other half standing. Depending on the shooting performance, extra distance or time is added to the contestant's total skiing distance/time. The contestant with the shortest total time wins.

For each shooting round, the biathlete must hit five targets or receive a penalty for each missed target, which varies according to the competition rules as follows:

 Skiing around a  penalty loop—typically taking 20–30 seconds for elite biathletes to complete, depending on weather and snow conditions.
 Adding one minute to the skier's total time.
 Use of an extra cartridge (placed at the shooting range) to hit the target; only three such extras are available for each round, and a penalty loop must be done for each target left standing.

In order to keep track of the contestants' progress and relative standing throughout a race, split times (intermediate times) are taken at several points along the skiing track and upon finishing each shooting round. The large display screens commonly set up at biathlon arenas, as well as the information graphics shown as part of the TV picture, will typically list the split time of the fastest contestant at each intermediate point and the times and time differences to the closest runners-up.

Skiing details
In the Olympics, all cross-country skiing techniques are permitted in the biathlon, allowing the use of skate skiing, which is overwhelmingly the choice of competitors. The minimum ski length is the height of the skier minus 4 cm. The rifle has to be carried by the skier during the race at all times.

Shooting details

The biathlete carries a small-bore rifle, which must weigh at least , excluding ammunition and magazines. The rifles use .22 LR ammunition and are bolt action or Fortner (straight-pull bolt) action. Each rifle holds 4 magazines with 5 rounds each. Additional rounds can be kept on the stock of the rifle for a relay race.

There are five circular shooting targets to be hit in each shooting round. This translates to angular target sizes of 0.9 and 2.3 mrad respectively. On all modern biathlon ranges, the targets are self-indicating, in that they flip from black to white when hit, giving the biathlete, as well as the spectators, instant visual feedback for each shot fired.

Ear protection is not required during biathlon shooting as the ammunition used is usually subsonic. An eyecup (blinder) is an optional feature of biathlon rifles.

Competition format

Individual
The  individual race [ for women] is the oldest biathlon event; the distance is skied over five laps. The biathlete shoots four times at any shooting lane (lanes 1–15 are in prone, while lanes 16–30 are for standing), in the order of prone, standing, prone, standing, totaling 20 targets. For each missed target, a fixed penalty time, usually one minute, is added to the skiing time of the biathlete. Competitors' starts are staggered, normally by 30 seconds.

A variation of the standard individual race, called short individual, was introduced during the 2018–19 Biathlon IBU Cup. The races are 15 km for men and 12.5 km for women, and for each missed target, 45 seconds will be added to the skiing time.

Sprint
The biathlete shoots twice at any shooting lane, once prone (usually lanes 1–15) and once standing (lanes 16–30), for a total of 10 shots. For each miss, a penalty loop of 150 m must be skied before continuing the race. As in the individual competition, the biathletes start in intervals.

Super Sprint 
Introduced at the 2017–18 Biathlon IBU Cup, the Super Sprint is a shorter version of the sprint race. Unlike the traditional sprint race, the Super Sprint is divided into two segments – qualification and final. The qualification is done like the traditional sprint, but on a 1.5 km lap with a total length of 4.5 km. Only the top 30 competitors qualify for the final, in which all competitors start simultaneously and do five laps on the same course (like in mass start) with a total race length of 4 km. During the final, the competitors have three spare rounds should they miss a target (like in relay race). However, if not all targets are cleared during shooting instead of going on the penalty loop, the biathlete is disqualified from the race.

Changes were made for the following season with the course now being 1 km (0.2 km increase) meaning that the qualification race length will become 3 km, while the final race becomes 5 km in length. Also the number of spare rounds was decreased from three to one.

Pursuit

In a pursuit, biathletes' starts are separated by their time differences from a previous race, most commonly a sprint. The contestant crossing the finish line first is the winner. The distance is 12.5 km for men and 10 km for women, skied over five laps; there are four shooting bouts (two prone, two standing, in that order) and each miss means a penalty loop of 150 m. To prevent awkward or dangerous crowding of the skiing loops and overcapacity at the shooting range, World Cup Pursuits are held with only the 60 top-ranking biathletes after the preceding race. The biathletes shoot on a first-come, first-served basis at the lane corresponding to the position they arrived for all shooting bouts. If the pursuit follows an individual biathlon race, the lag behind the winner is halved.

Mass start
In the mass start, all biathletes start at the same time, and the first across the finish line wins. In this 15 km for men or 12.5 km for women competition, the distance is skied over five laps; there are four bouts of shooting (two prone, two standing, in that order), with the first shooting bout being at the lane corresponding to the competitor's bib number (bib #10 shoots at lane #10 regardless of position in race), with the rest of the shooting bouts being on a first-come, first-served basis (if a competitor arrives at the lane in fifth place, they shoot at lane 5). As in sprint and pursuit, competitors must ski one 150 m penalty loop for each miss. Here again, to avoid unwanted congestion, World Cup Mass starts are held with only the 30 top ranking athletes on the start line (half that of the Pursuit as here all contestants start simultaneously).

Mass start 60
Starting in the 2018/2019 season, the Mass Start 60 became part of the International Biathlon Union (IBU) competition formats. The Mass Start with 60 starters does not replace the current Mass Start with 30 starters.

Everyone skis the first lap together, but only the first 30 stop to shoot, and the second 30 keep skiing. At the end of the second lap, the second 30 stop to shoot, and the first 30 continue to ski. After the first two shoots are over (everyone's first prone), the race continues like a typical race, and all competitors shoot remaining prone, and two stands together. Or more simply:

Bib 1–30 = lap, shoot1, lap, lap, shoot2, lap, shoot3, lap, shoot4, lap

Bib 31–60 = lap, lap, shoot1, lap, shoot2, lap, shoot3, lap, shoot4, lap

Relay
The relay teams consist of four biathletes, who each ski 7.5 km (men) or 6 km (women), each leg skied over three laps, with two shooting rounds; one prone, one standing. For every round of five targets, there are eight bullets available. However, the last three can only be single-loaded manually one at a time from spare round holders or bullets deposited by the competitor into trays or onto the mat at the firing line. If there are still standing targets after eight bullets, one 150 m (490 ft) penalty loop must be taken for each missed target remaining. The first-leg participants all start simultaneously, and as in cross-country skiing relays, every athlete of a team must touch the team's next-leg participant to perform a valid changeover. On the first shooting stage of the first leg, the participant must shoot in the lane corresponding to their bib number (bib #10 shoots at lane #10 regardless of their position in the race), then for the remainder of the relay, the relay team shoots on a first-come, first-served basis (arrive at the range in fifth place, shoot at lane 5).

Mixed relay
The mixed relay is similar to the ordinary relay, but the teams are composed of two women and two men. From its first instance at the world championships in 2005 until the end of the 2017 season, the first two legs were always run by the women, followed by the men on legs 3 and 4. Since the 2018 season however, the race can be started by either the men or women . Additionally, throughout most the event's history, the women's legs have been  and the men's legs  as in ordinary relay competitions.
This event was added to the Olympics starting in 2014.

Single mixed relay
In 2015, the single mixed relay was introduced to the Biathlon World Cup by the IBU. The event is run on a  track with a  penalty loop, and each team consists of a female and a male runner. The race is divided into four legs, with the first three being  or 2 laps and the final leg being  or 3 laps, totalling . After each leg, the runners exchange so that each runner completes two legs. Specific to this format, the exchange happens immediately after the last shooting of each leg without skiing an additional lap (as is usually the case). The race can be started by either the female or male member of the relay, with the finishing member performing an extra lap. This event was added to the world championships in 2019.

Team (obsolete)
A team consists of four biathletes, but unlike the relay competition, all team members start at the same time. Two athletes must shoot in the prone shooting round, the other two in the standing round. In case of a miss, the two non-shooting biathletes must ski a penalty loop of 150 m (490 ft). The skiers must enter the shooting area together and must also finish within 15 seconds of each other; otherwise, a time penalty of one minute is added to the total time. Since 2004, this race format has been obsolete at the World Cup level.

Broadcasting
Biathlon events are broadcast most regularly where the sport enjoys its greatest popularity, namely Germany (ARD, ZDF), Austria (ORF), Norway (NRK), France (L'Équipe 21), Finland (YLE), Estonia (ETV), Latvia (LTV), Lithuania (LRT), Croatia (HRT), Poland (Polsat), Ukraine (UA:PBC), Sweden (SVT), Russia (Match TV, Channel One), Belarus (TVR), Slovenia (RTV), Bosnia and Herzegovina (BHRT), Bulgaria (BNT), and South Korea (KBS); it is broadcast on European-wide Eurosport, which also broadcasts to the Asia-Pacific region. World Cup races are streamed via the IBU website.

The broadcast distribution being one indicator, the constellation of a sport's main sponsors usually gives a similar, and correlated, indication of popularity: for biathlon, these are the Germany-based companies BMW (cars), Erdinger (beer), Viessmann (boilers and other heating systems) and DKB (banking).

Biathlon records and statistics
The IBU maintains biathlon records, rules, news, videos, and statistics for many years back, all of which are available at its web site.

See also
 Biathlon World Cup
 Biathlon World Championships
 List of Olympic medalists in biathlon
 Paralympic biathlon
 Nordic field biathlon and moose biathlon, Nordic biathlon variants using fullbore rifles

Biathlon's two sports disciplines:
 Cross-country skiing (sport)
 Rifle shooting sports

Other multi-discipline sports (otherwise unrelated to biathlon):
 Duathlon
 Nordic Combined
 Triathlon
 Pentathlon
 Modern pentathlon
 Heptathlon
 Decathlon
 Chess boxing
 Omnium (track cycling)

Notes and sources

External links

 Biathlonworld.Com – A cooperation between IBU and EBU; with race results/statistics, TV schedules, live competition results, and so on.

National Associations 
 Belarusian Biathlon Union 
 Russian Biathlon Union 
 Russian Biathlon Union 
 Biathlon Canada
 U.S. Biathlon Association
 Biathlon Russia
 Biathlon Ukraine 
 Biathlon Ukraine 
 BiathlonFrance.com

 
Cross-country skiing
Military sports
Multisports
Racing
Rifle shooting sports
Sports originating in Norway
Winter Olympic sports